Anne-Marie Slaughter (born September 27, 1958) is an American international lawyer, foreign policy analyst, political scientist and public commentator. From 2002 to 2009, she was the dean of Princeton University's School of Public and International Affairs and the Bert G. Kerstetter '66 university professor of politics and international affairs. Slaughter was the first woman to serve as the director of policy planning for the U.S. State Department from January 2009 until February 2011 under U.S. secretary of state Hillary Clinton. She is a former president of the American Society of International Law and the current president and CEO of New America (formerly the New America Foundation).

Slaughter has received several awards for her work including: the Woodrow Wilson School R.W. van de Velde Award, 1979; the Thomas Jefferson Medal in Law, University of Virginia and Thomas Jefferson Foundation, 2007; Distinguished Service Medal, U.S. Secretary of state 2011; Louis B. Sohn Award for Public International Law, American Bar association, 2012.

As author and editor Slaughter has worked on eight books, including A New World Order (2004); The Idea That Is America: Keeping Faith with Our Values in a Dangerous World (2007); Unfinished Business: Women, Men, Work, Family (2015); The Chessboard and the Web: Strategies of Connection in a Dangerous World (2017), as well as many scholarly articles. She revived a national debate over gender equality in the twenty-first century in an article in The Atlantic titled "Why Women Still Can't Have it All." Slaughter is on the Global Advisory Board of Oxford University's journal Global Summitry: Politics, Economics, and Law in International Governance.

Early life, family and honors

Slaughter was born and raised in Charlottesville, Virginia, the daughter of a Belgian mother, Anne Marie Denise Limbosch, and an American father, Edward Ratliff Slaughter Jr., a lawyer. Her paternal grandfather was Edward Slaughter, a football player, athletic coach, and professor of physical education. She is married to Princeton politics professor Andrew Moravcsik, with whom she has two children: Alex and Michael Moravcsik.

Slaughter is a 1976 graduate of St. Anne's-Belfield School in Charlottesville, Virginia. She graduated magna cum laude with an A.B. from the Princeton School of Public and International Affairs at Princeton University in 1980, where she also received a certificate in European cultural studies. Mentored by Richard H. Ullman, she won the Daniel M. Sachs Memorial Scholarship, which provides for two years of study at Worcester College, Oxford. After receiving her M.Phil. in international affairs from Oxford in 1982, she studied at Harvard Law School and graduated cum laude with a J.D. in 1985. She continued at Harvard as a researcher for her academic mentor, international lawyer Abram Chayes. In 1992, she received her D.Phil. in international relations from Oxford.

Slaughter received honorary degrees from the University of Miami in 2006, the University of Warwick in 2013, and Tufts University in 2014. She also won the University of Virginia's Thomas Jefferson Medal in 2007. She is a Fellow of the American Academy of Arts and Sciences.

Academic career

Scholarship and teaching
Slaughter served on the faculty of the University of Chicago Law School from 1989 to 1994 and then as J. Sinclair Armstrong Professor of International, Foreign, and Comparative Law on the faculty of Harvard Law School from 1994 to 2002. She then moved to Princeton to serve as dean of the Woodrow Wilson School, the first woman to hold that position. She held that post from 2002 to 2009, when she accepted an appointment at the US State Department. During the academic year 2007–2008, Slaughter was a visiting fellow at the Shanghai Institute for International Affairs. In 2011, she returned to Princeton as a professor.

As a scholar, Slaughter has had a focus on integrating the study of international relations and international law, using international relations theory in international legal theory. In addition, she has written extensively on European Union politics, network theories of world politics, transjudicial communication, liberal theories of international law and international relations, American foreign policy, international law, and various types of policy analysis. She has written books: International Law and International Relations (2000), A New World Order (2004), The Idea that is America: Keeping Faith with our Values in a Dangerous World (2007), and The Crisis of American Foreign Policy: Wilsonianism in the Twenty-first Century (with G. John Ikenberry, Thomas J. Knock, and Tony Smith) (2008), as well as three edited volumes on international relations and international law, and over one hundred extended articles in scholarly and policy journals or books.

At Princeton University, she holds joint appointments with the Politics Department and the Woodrow Wilson School, where she teaches and advises PhD, Masters and undergraduate students.

Administration
Slaughter was director of the International Legal Studies Program at Harvard Law School from 1994 to 2002, and a professor at Harvard Kennedy School from 2001 to 2002.

During her tenure as dean of the Princeton School of Public and International Affairs, Princeton's international relations faculty hired scholars including Robert Keohane, Helen Milner, and G. John Ikenberry. Other hires included Aaron Friedberg and Thomas Christensen. Slaughter was responsible for the creation of several research centers in international political economy and national security, the joint Ph.D. program in Social Policy, the Global Fellows program, and the Scholars in the Nation's Service Initiative.

In late 2005, over 100 Princeton students and faculty signed an open letter to Slaughter and Princeton president Shirley M. Tilghman criticizing the university in general and the Princeton School of Public and International Affairs in particular of biasing selection of invited speakers in favor of those supportive of the George W. Bush administration. Slaughter responded to these claims by pointing to the dozens of public lectures by independent academics, journalists, and other analysts that the Wilson School hosts each academic year.  Others noted that, with Bush's Republican Party controlling the Presidency and both houses of Congress, many of the most influential people in the federal government, and in the international relations apparatus in particular, were necessarily administration supporters. In 2003 the Woodrow Wilson School hosted an art exhibit titled "Ricanstructions" that opponents of the exhibit claimed was "offensive to Catholics" and desecrated Christian symbols. Slaughter defended the exhibit.

From 2002 to 2004, Slaughter served as president of the American Society of International Law. She was also one of the early members on the Centre for International Governance Innovation international board of directors.

Career at the State Department
On 23 January 2009, U.S. Secretary of State Hillary Clinton announced the appointment of Slaughter as the new director of policy planning under the Obama administration. Slaughter was the first woman to hold this position.

At the State Department, Slaughter was chief architect of the Quadrennial Diplomacy and Development Review whose first iteration was released in December 2010. The QDDR provided a blueprint for elevating development as a pillar of American foreign policy and leading through civilian power. Commenting upon the skepticism that often greets such reports, and reiterating Secretary Clinton's strong desire that the QDDR become an essential part of the State Department policy process, Slaughter said: "I'm pretty sure you're thinking, 'I've heard this before,' [a big plan to change the way a government agency works] But this is different." Slaughter received the Secretary's Distinguished Service Award for exceptional leadership and professional competence, the highest honor conferred by the State Department. She also received a Meritorious Honor Award from the U.S. Agency for International Development for her outstanding contribution to development policy.

In February 2011, at the conclusion of her two-year public service leave, Slaughter returned to Princeton University. She remains a consultant for the State Department and sits on the secretary of state's Foreign Policy Advisory Board. She has written that she came "home not only because of Princeton's rules (after two years of leave, you lose your tenure), but also because of my desire to be with my family and my conclusion that juggling high-level government work with the needs of two teenage boys was not possible."

A 2015 article in Marie Claire magazine quoted Hillary Clinton as saying that "other women don't break a sweat" and choose to stay working in stressful government jobs. Since the article discussed Anne-Marie Slaughter in the same paragraph, Slaughter mentioned that she was "devastated" by the idea that Clinton had been referring to her specifically. After hearing confirmation from Clinton that the quotation was taken out of context, Slaughter stated that the two women were still on good terms.

Other policy, public, and corporate activities
In the 1980s, as a student, Slaughter was part of the team headed by Professor Abram Chayes that helped the Sandinista government of Nicaragua bring suit against the United States in the International Court of Justice for violations of international law, in the case Nicaragua v. United States (1986).

Since leaving the State Department, Slaughter remains a frequent commentator on foreign policy issues by publishing op-eds in major newspapers, magazines and blogs and curating foreign policy news on Twitter. She appears regularly on CNN, BBC, NPR, and PBS and lectures to academic, civic, and corporate audiences. She has written a regular opinion column for Project Syndicate since January 2012. She delivers more than 60 public lectures annually. Foreign Policy magazine named her to their annual list of the Top100 Global Thinkers in 2009, 2010, 2011 and 2012.

She has served on the boards of numerous non-profit organizations, including the Council of Foreign Relations, the New America Foundation, the National Endowment for Democracy, the National Security Network and the Brookings Doha Center. She is a member of the advisory board of the Center for New American Security, the Truman Project, and the bipartisan Development Council of the Center for Strategic and International Studies. In 2006, she chaired the Secretary of State's Advisory Committee on Democracy Promotion. From 2004 to 2007, she was a co-director of the Princeton Project on National Security.

She was elected to the American Philosophical Society in 2011.

In the private sector, she started her law career at the corporate firm Simpson Thacher and is currently on the corporate board of Abt Associates, a for-profit government contractor involved in research, evaluation and implementing programs in the fields of health, social and environmental policy, and international development. She was previously on the board of the McDonald's Corporation and that of the Citigroup Economic and Political Strategies Advisory Group.

In 2013, Slaughter was named president and CEO of the New America Foundation, a think-tank based in Washington, D.C. dedicated to renewing America in the Digital Age. Their "Better Life Lab" key projects and initiatives include Family Policy and Caregiving, Redesigning Work and Gender Equality, a topic Slaughter has been outspoken about in several of her writings.

On the responsibility to protect

In July 2005, Slaughter wrote in the American Journal of International Law about the responsibility to protect (R2P) that:

In her 2006 Levine lecture at Fordham University, Slaughter called the R2P "the most important shift in our conception of sovereignty since the Treaty of Westphalia in 1648," and founded it in the Four Freedoms speech by President Roosevelt. She referred to a speech by Kofi Annan, in which he saw that the United Nations had come to a "fork in the road" and in her words "that it was time to decide how to adapt the institution to not the world of 1945 but the world of 2005".

On Libyan intervention
United Nations Security Council Resolution 1970 and United Nations Security Council Resolution 1973, on the situation in Libya, were adopted on 26 February and 17 March 2011, respectively. Resolution 1970 was the first case where the Security Council authorized a military intervention citing the R2P; it passed unanimously. One week after the adoption with many abstentions of the latter Resolution, Slaughter wrote a strong endorsement of Western military intervention in Libya.

In this op-ed, Slaughter states her support for the NATO use of force in Libya, describing a lack of NATO as an invitation for other regional regimes to increase their repression to remain in power. She frames the conflict as between value-based and interest-based arguments on intervention, stating that they cannot be distinguished from each other, and states her support for the role of President Barack Obama in helping to form an international coalition to oppose Muammar Gadhafi. Slaughter states that she supports the Libyan Transitional National Council draft constitutional charter and states that she supports comparisons to Iraq, arguing they might prevent similar mistakes in Libya.

On 25 August 2011, she was roundly criticized by Matt Welch, who sorted through many of Slaughter's prior op-eds and concluded that she was a "situational constitutionalist".

Clifford May on 15 October 2014 wrote a piece in which he drew a straight line between Annan and Slaughter's R2P "norm", and the failure in Libya. May noted that President Obama had cited the R2P norm as his primary justification for using military force with Libyan dictator Moammar Gadhafi, who had threatened to attack the opposition stronghold of Benghazi.

On 26 February 2015, Forbes magazine published a piece by Doug Bandow which called for Washington policymakers to be held accountable for another war gone bad. Slaughter was singled out for criticism, for her statement that "it clearly can be in the U.S. and the West's strategic interest to help social revolutions fighting for the values we espouse and proclaim[,]" in an article Bandow characterized as "celebratory" concerning the outcome of NATO intervention in Libya.

On how gender impacts work-family balance
Slaughter's article titled "Why Women Still Can't Have it All" appeared in the July/August 2012 issue of The Atlantic. In the first four days after publication, the piece attracted 725,000 unique readers, making it the most popular article ever published in that magazine. In the same period, it received over 119,000 Facebook "Recommends," making it by far the most "liked" piece ever to appear in any version of the magazine. Within several days, it had been discussed in detail on the front page of The New York Times and in many other media outlets, attracting attention from around the world. Although Slaughter originally tried to call the article "Why Women Can't Have it All Yet," she has since stated that it was a mistake to use the phrase "Have it All" in general. In 2015, Slaughter clarified that she hoped to stimulate a discussion about a wide range of working mothers, not only those in prestigious or lucrative careers.

Unfinished Business: Women Men Work Family

The article in The Atlantic became the basis of the 2015 book Unfinished Business: Women Men Work Family. The book argues that a number of challenges remain for the women's movement in the US. It allows her to expands on her position in the article and respond to her critics. In Unfinished Business, she attempts to create a framework to understand the problems faced by all working parents, not just women.

President and CEO of New America

Slaughter was named president and CEO of the think-tank New America in 2013. In 2017, The New York Times alleged that Slaughter had closed the Open Markets research group and dismissed its director Barry Lynn because he had criticized Google, a major donor of New America, and called for it to be broken up. Slaughter denied that Open Markets was closed because of pressure from Google and said Lynn was dismissed because he had "repeatedly violated the standards of honesty and good faith with his colleagues." New America co-chair Jonathan Soros wrote in a letter that Google had neither "attempted to interfere" nor "threaten[ed] funding" over Open Markets research critical of monopolies. In a letter to New America's board and leadership, 25 former and current New America fellows said that although they had "never experienced any efforts by donors or managers at New America to influence [their] work," they "were troubled by the initial lack of transparency and communication from New America's leadership" and "remained deeply concerned about this sequence of events".

Bibliography as author

References

External links

 Princeton faculty page

1958 births
Living people
Alumni of Worcester College, Oxford
American nonprofit chief executives
American people of Belgian descent
American women chief executives
American women lawyers
Atlantic Council
Carnegie Council for Ethics in International Affairs
Directors of Policy Planning
Fellows of the American Academy of Arts and Sciences
Harvard Law School alumni
Harvard Law School faculty
Presidents of the American Society of International Law
New America (organization)
Obama administration personnel
People from Charlottesville, Virginia
Princeton University alumni
Princeton University faculty
Responsibility to protect
University of Chicago Law School faculty
American women legal scholars
Members of the American Philosophical Society
21st-century American women